Palaeosinopa is an extinct genus of semi-aquatic, non-placental eutherian mammals belonging to the family Pantolestidae. Their diet consisted of other semi-aquatic life forms.

References

Cimolestans
Eocene mammals
Eocene mammals of North America
Fossil taxa described in 1901
Prehistoric mammal genera